Kendall Brown (born 15 August 1989 in Dunedin, New Zealand), is a halfpipe snowboarder based in Wanaka, New Zealand. At age 16 years old, at the 2006 Winter Olympics she finished 25th. At the 2010 Winter Olympics she finished 15th, after dislocating her shoulder twice in the semi finals.

Career
She started snowboarding aged 11. She uses a goofy stance, i.e. leads with the right foot.

Sponsorships
Brown has a sponsorship with Roxy, the women's brand of the Australian surfing company Quiksilver.

References 

1989 births
Living people
New Zealand female snowboarders
Olympic snowboarders of New Zealand
Snowboarders at the 2006 Winter Olympics
Snowboarders at the 2010 Winter Olympics
Sportspeople from Dunedin
People from Wānaka